General Seitz may refer toL

John F. R. Seitz (1908–1978), U.S. Army major general
John A. Seitz (1908–1987), U.S. Army brigadier general
Richard J. Seitz (1918–2013), U.S. Army lieutenant general